Henry Bagot (c. 1507 – 1536 or later) was the member of the Parliament of England for Marlborough for the parliament of 1529.

References 

Members of Parliament for Marlborough
English MPs 1529–1536
Year of birth uncertain
1500s births
Year of death unknown